Ildephonse Sehirwa is a Rwandan long-distance runner. He competed in the men's marathon at the 1992 Summer Olympics.

References

Year of birth missing (living people)
Living people
Athletes (track and field) at the 1992 Summer Olympics
Rwandan male long-distance runners
Rwandan male marathon runners
Olympic athletes of Rwanda
Place of birth missing (living people)